Melanie Jans (born July 3, 1973) is a Canadian professional female squash player who represented Canada during her career. She reached a career-high world ranking of World No. 25 in March 1999 after having joined the Women's International Squash Players Association in 1991.

After retiring from professional sport, JANS joined Club Meadowvale in Mississauga as the Club Pro. Since January 2018 Melanie has been the Oakville Club squash professional.

In 2015 JANS was inducted in to the Ontario Squash Hall of Fame, and subsequently inducted in the Canadian Squash Hall of Fame in 2022

External links 
 

1973 births
Living people
Canadian female squash players
Pan American Games gold medalists for Canada
Pan American Games silver medalists for Canada
Pan American Games medalists in squash
Squash players at the 1999 Pan American Games
Squash players at the 2003 Pan American Games
Sportspeople from Montreal
Medalists at the 1999 Pan American Games
Medalists at the 2003 Pan American Games